The Lippisch P.20 was a proposed World War II German fighter aircraft. The P.20 design of April 1943 was an attempt to further develop the rocket-powered Me 163 interceptor into a feasible turbojet powered fighter.

The design was the final one by Alexander Lippisch whilst working for the Messerschmitt company. The aircraft never left the drawing board.

Design and development
The aircraft was externally similar to the Me 163 upon which it was based, although the P.20 was in fact a new design sharing only few parts with the Me 163. The fuselage was deepened accommodating a single Jumo 004 turbojet fed by a low mounted nose intake. The wings were modified in order to house a retractable landing gear and two heavy MK 103 autocannons in the wing roots. They no longer had to hold the C-Stoff fuel tanks but smaller tanks might have been installed to hold jet fuel. The cockpit was moved further aft and upwards leaving room for two MK 108 autocannons and the nose wheel. This wheel probably had to turn 90 degrees to lie flat in order not to disrupt the air flow of the air intake. The raised cockpit gave it a more curved appearance. Also the tail section seems to have been modified. As such the Lippisch P.20 was a new design, yet holding on to the overall concept of the Me 163 design which had resulted in a manoeuvrable and easy-to-fly (glider) aircraft. Maximum speed was calculated at well above 900 kmh with a flight endurance of 40 minutes.

See also
Lippisch P.15: A later attempt by Lippisch to similarly develop the Me 163. It was a result of Alexander Lippisch inspecting the new Heinkel He 162 Volksjäger aircraft and suggesting some changes. The result was a mix of a He 162 and the Me 163C.
Focke-Wulf Volksjäger

References

External links

Lippisch P.20 von Insider Modellbau - YouTube

Abandoned military aircraft projects of Germany
P.20